Åland pancake is a type of oven-baked pancake made with semolina and flavoured with cardamom. It can be served either warm or cold, and traditionally with whipped cream and prunes.

The standard ingredients are semolina, eggs, cardamom, sugar and salt, but a variant replaces semolina with pudding rice. The pancake is traditionally served with sviskonkräm (prune jam) and whipped cream (which in Åland is called snömos,  'snow mash'). Depending on the recipe and accompaniments, the dish can be served either as a dessert or as a sweet snack.

The Åland pancake is similar to the Gotland pancake, with the latter being made with rice, and flavoured with saffron instead of cardamom.

The Åland pancake probably has its origins in the Åland archipelago, as a dish that could be prepared quickly if you had an unexpected visit and did not have much in the pantry. You could then take what was left of the morning porridge, season it and make a pancake.

On Åland's Autonomy Day of 9 June, Åland pancakes are usually served on the main square in Mariehamn.

References

Culture of Åland
Finnish breads
Pancakes